Quand l'éternité... is the name of the fourth studio album recorded by the French singer Hélène Ségara, and her seventh overall. It was released in September 2006, and even if it started at the top of the charts, it was one of Ségara's less-selling albums.

Track listing

Certifications and sales

Charts

References

2006 albums
Hélène Ségara albums
Mercury Records albums